Cariñito is a Peruvian cumbia song written by Limeño Ángel Aníbal Rosado in 1979 and first interpreted by the Peruvian group Los Hijos del Sol. Readapted by numerous international groups and in different musical styles, the song is one of the best-known songs in the realm of Peruvian cumbia and cumbia in general.

History 
In 1976, Ángel Aníbal Rosado founded Los Hijos del Sol. In 1979, he composed Cariñito to be adapted by the group led by vocalist Edson Bordaes and accompanied by guitarist José Luis Carvallo. The song became an immediate success and multiple versions and adaptations began to rise internationally.

In 2007, Oliver Conan and Barbes Records, an American music company, presented The Roots of Chicha, a compilation of signature pieces of music derived from the origins of Peruvian tropical music, three of which were by Los Hijos de Sol, one being Cariñito. The compilation received massive popularity, leading to widespread recognition of the song as well as Peruvian cumbia.

In the 2019 Panamerican Games in Lima, the song was played in the inaugural parade of countries during the entry of the Peruvian delegation, played to symbolize progress in Peru and its diverse cultural identity. The song received positive reception from Peruvians, such so that the President of Peru was seen singing and dancing from the Presidential Pulpit in the Estadio Nacional de Lima.

Other versions 

 In Colombia, Rodolfo Aicardi of Los Hispanos recorded another version of Cariñito in 1979. Aicardi included guitars and saxophones to accompany the song.
One night in 1979 Rodolfo Aicardi came to the recording studios of Discos Fuentes happily and said to Pedro Muriel: “I am successful for this year. I heard it in Ecuador and we are going to record it ”. In one case, there was a performance by a Peruvian orchestra, "Los Niños del Sol."

They listened to the two verses that the song has: “I cry for loving you / For loving you and for wanting you / I cry for loving you / For loving you and for wanting you / Ay darling ay my life. Never but never / He abandons me dear / Never but never / He abandons me dear. ”That was all. Nothing else said the lyrics, but had feeling.

Immediately Pedro Muriel - the recorder of more than 300 great successes of Discos Fuentes - called the Los Hispanos team. The teacher Luis Carlos Montoya, an experienced arranger for tropical songs, took care of the arrangements. It had already worked with "Boquita de Caramelo" that had served as a resurgence for Rodolfo and now they would have another great success. They foreshadowed it.

Luis Carlos Montoya is a skilled musician. He plays violin, guitar, accordion, bass and the musical notes roll in his mind with agility. Lucho Cruz "Condorito", Jaime Uribe, the monkey Ospina, Jairo and Guillermo Jiménez formed the payroll that "Cariñito" recorded. "Rodolfo could not record if Jairo did not play the bass," says Pedro Muriel now.

What they sensed became reality. That December the national success was "Cariñito" and the most sensational, the following year he repeated the triumph and not to believe it, in 1981, it was also. In taverns, bars, discos, buses, taxis, "I cry for loving you, for loving you and for wanting you" was sung. The decade of the eighties gave the subject to be edited in dozens of compilations of Discos Fuentes. In the famous 14 cannon shots they appeared in several editions and it was a compulsory subject in Rodolfo Aicardi's concerts. "I had to sing it up to 3 times," says Pedro Muriel now.
 In the midst of the 1980s in Chile, the group Pachuco y la Cubanacan included their own version of Cariñito.

 In the beginning of 2000, Chilean band Chico Trujillo played their version of Cariñito, en Berlín y en Chile. This version consolidated its popularity amongst the young populations of Chile.
 In 2007, the Ecuadorian group Kien Mató a Rosero adapted the version using electric guitars in their shows and in 2009 recorded their readapting to the album "A lo Rosero".

 The Peruvian music group Bareto used electric guitar to readapt the Rosado's original version and recorded their version to their album Sodoma y Gamarra (2009).

 Los Angeles band La Chamba worked with the original guitarist on the 1979 track, José Luis Carballo, to record their cover of “Cariñito"

References 

Spanish-language songs
1979 songs